was a town located in Kudō District, Hiyama Subprefecture, Hokkaido, Japan.

As of 2004, the town had an estimated population of 2,458 and a density of 18.36 persons per km2. The total area was 133.91 km2.

On September 1, 2005, Taisei, along with the town of Kitahiyama (from Setana District) was merged into the expanded town of Setana (formerly from Setana District, now in Kudō District).

External links
Setana official website 

Dissolved municipalities of Hokkaido